Yurtseven Kardeşler (literally the Yurtseven Siblings" in Turkish), YK for short, was at the beginning an amateur band working through Germany where they used to reside. Between 1985 and 1987, they released two amateur albums and gained some attention. Their break came with an appearance in 1988 in German ZDF television channel's "Nachbarn in Europa" programme.

Yurtseven Kardeşler relatively successful albums included: Bir Tek Sen / Barış Olsun in 1998 with Akbaş Müzik label, Toprak in 2000 with Akbaş Müzik label and De Bana / Of Anam Of in 2001 with joint Akbaş Müzik/Türküola label.

In 2004, after searching for bigger labels, the Avrupa Müzik offered them a contract and the album Şimdi Halay Zamanı in 2004 and Seni Hiç Aşık Oldun Mu? in 2007 were released finding huge success in Turkey.

In addition, a member of the Yurtseven Kardeşler, namely İsmail YK has a very successful solo career.

Members
The members of Yurtseven Kardeşler were:
Hüseyin Yurtseven, born 15 July 1961
Hasan Yurtseven, born 2 May 1965 
Mustafa Yurtseven, born 28 November 1966
Zeynep Yurtseven, born 14 January 1969 
İsmail Yurtseven, born 5 July 1978 (aka İsmail YK)

Discography

Albums / Tracks
Dom Dom (1985)
 Dom Dom Kurşunu
 Oturur Derdini
 Karadeniz
 Emine
 Hüdayda(Enstrümental)
 Dağlar Seni Delik Deşik
 Maşallah
 Yalan Dünya
 Liebe Gaby
 Darıldım Darıldım

Son Yolcumsun (1987)
 Atalım Mı Kızlar
 Toprak
 Hem O Yandan Hem Bu Yandan
 Son Yolcumsun
 Kaymakamın Kizları
 Mevlam Sabır Versin
 Canim Sıkıldı
 Vuruldum
 Sensiz Dunyam Neye Yarar
 Ruyam Benim
 Sev Take My Heart
 Samsun'un Evleri
 Yar Yar Yar Aman

Bir Tek Sen-Barış Olsun (1996)
 Barış Olsun 
 Gitme Turnam Vuracaklar 
 Leylim Leyli 
 Sevgilim 
 Ah Le Aney 
 Yalansın Dünya 
 Züleyha 
 Halay (Enstrümantal) 
 Gel Oyna 
 Seninle 
 Güzel Yarim 
 Görmek İsterim 
 Hey Sen de Gel (Dance) 
 Hazır mısınız? (Techno) 
 Bir Tek Sen (Dance) 
 Misket (Instrumental)

Toprak (1998)
 Hop De Bakim 
 Cin misin Peri misin ?
 Ağlarım 
 Cankız 
 Canın Çıksın 
 Toprak 
 Halayımız Bitmesin 
 Kalmadı 
 Hoşuma Gittin 
 Kıskanır 
 Sev Sev 
 Kaçır Beni 
 Çek Git 
 Hüdayda (Instrumental)

Of Anam Of (2001)
 De Bana 
 Yalanmış 
 Hayatımı Mahvettin 
 Tek Tek Saydım 
 Uzun İnce Bir Yoldayım 
 Dostluk Halayı 
 Selam Karadeniz'e 
 Elveda 
 Of Anam Of 
 Gitme Canım 
 Veremem Seni 
 Ali Baba'nın Çiftliği 
 Özledim 
 Zühtü 
 Elveda (Instrumental)

Şimdi Halay Zamanı (2005)
 Sevdalıyım (Kız Ben Senin Canına) 
 Amanım 
 Kaymakam'ın Kızları 
 Şimdi Halay Zamanı 
 Kırmızı Kurdele 
 Makaram Sarı Bağlar 
 Çöz de Al 
 YK Halayı 
 Deliloy 
 Zühtü (New Version)

Sen Hiç Aşık Oldun mu? (2007)
  Kanka (Sen Hiç Aşık Oldun mu?)
  Lokum Gibi
  Ölmek Vardır Dönmek Yoktur
  Dilini mi Yuttun?
  Elimde Değil
  Olmaz Deme
  Pişmanım
  Boşver Salla
  Yandı Ha Yandı
  Şak Şak Ellere
  Umurumda Değil
  Kaçma Yar
  Vay Gözünü Sevdiğimin Dünyası
  Albüm Özetleri

Sevmeseydin (2020)
  Sevmeseydin

References

External links
 Yurtseven Kardeşler official website

Turkish musical groups